Inspirative is a post-rock band from Bangkok, Thailand formed in 2006. The band initially started as a solo project of Noppanan Panicharoen. All members joined in 2008 and turned into a full band consisting of Noppanan Panicharoen (guitar), Amornthep Masawang (Bass), Pongpat Phaukwattana (Guitar), Sirichai Chanmanklakul (Drums), Wuttipong Huangpetch (Piano, Vocal).
The band's music is composed of expansive melodic guitar based and ambient field recordings.

The band joined a label call FinalKid Group in 2007 and released two tracks “The Lost Moment” and “After Sunset” in the FinalKid Compilation 2. In 2008, Inspirative released a three-song EP Floating Down Through The Clouds.

The band start to be well known as the new group in the indie listener. On MARS magazine The album had been reviewed in MARS Magazine.
On October 16, 2010 DISPLAY magazine had chance to interview about the origin of the band and it provided on online media

In March 2011, The band had been in the final list of the candidate the term of the instrumental music with the Flames Tree tracks on 23rd Season award, Bangkok, Thailand

In May 2011, the band have chance to perform live on music gang program (Truemusic channel) with exclusive interview

Band members 
 Noppanan Panicharoen – Lead guitar
 Pongpat Phaukwattana – Rhythm guitar
 Amornthep Masawang – Bass guitar
 Sirichai Chanmanklakul – Drums
 Wuttipong Huangpetch - Piano, Vocal

Discography 
 FinalKid Compilation 2 (2007)
 Floating Down Through The Clouds EP (2008)
 The Sleeping Tracks (2009)
 Memories Come Rushing Up To Meet Me Now (2010)
 When We Talk EP (2011)
 Mysteriously Awake (2015)

References

External links 
 Inspirative interview on display magazine

Post-rock groups
Musical groups established in 2006
Thai rock music groups
Musical groups from Bangkok